"Fun Factory" is a single by English rock band the Damned, released in December 1990 on Deltic Records.

The band had split in 1989, but reformed shortly thereafter for touring. Captain Sensible was set to return, and sought the other band members' permission to reissue the track "Fun Factory", recorded in late 1982 (and featuring King Crimson's Robert Fripp on guitar), but shelved when the Damned's record company (Bronze Records) went bankrupt in early 1983. While it was not attached to any Damned album, it has been issued on several compilations.

The B-side was a solo track by Sensible, a remix of a track from his 1989 solo album Revolution Now. The bonus tracks on the 12" and CD singles were also solo Sensible works.

Track listing
 "Fun Factory" (Sensible) - 3:59
 "A Riot on Eastbourne Pier (Remix)" (Sensible)

12"/CD single: -

"Fun Factory" (Sensible) - 3:59 
"A Riot on Eastbourne Pier (Remix)" (Sensible)
"Freedom" (Sensible)
 "Pasties" (Sensible)

Production credits
 Producer:
 Captain Sensible
 Musicians:
 Dave Vanian − vocals on "Fun Factory"
 Captain Sensible − guitar, vocals
 Rat Scabies − drums
 Paul Gray − bass on "Fun Factory" & "A Riot On Eastbourne Pier"
 Guest Musician
 Robert Fripp − guitar on "Fun Factory"

External links

1991 singles
Songs written by Captain Sensible
The Damned (band) songs
1982 songs
British rock songs